The St. Anne Catholic Church in Napoleonville, Louisiana is a historic Roman Catholic church which was built in 1909.  It is located about four blocks inland from Bayou Lafourche at 417 St. Joseph Street, as part of a two-block parcel which includes a contributing rectory (1895) and a contributing cemetery (started 1874), as well as three non-contributing buildings.  It was added to the National Register in 2001.

It is a one-story basilica plan church reflecting Romanesque influence with a gable front flanked by two towers, one dating to c.1920 and reflecting Colonial Revival architecture.  The church has a number of large round arch windows, with those on the nave and chancel topped by brick archivolts "laid in corbelled concentric semicircles to suggest texture".  As there are many other elements of styling in the design of the church which achieve a pleasing appearance, it was deemed "an outstanding candidate for National Register listing" in its nomination.

References

See also
National Register of Historic Places listings in Assumption Parish, Louisiana

Churches in Assumption Parish, Louisiana
Roman Catholic churches in Louisiana
Roman Catholic churches completed in 1909
Churches on the National Register of Historic Places in Louisiana
Romanesque Revival church buildings in Louisiana
Colonial Revival architecture in Louisiana
National Register of Historic Places in Assumption Parish, Louisiana
Buildings and structures in Napoleonville, Louisiana
20th-century Roman Catholic church buildings in the United States